Crazy Love may refer to:

Film and television
 Crazy Love (1979 film), an Argentine film directed by Eva Landeck
 Crazy Love (1987 film), a Belgian film directed by Dominique Deruddere
 Crazy Love (1993 film), a Hong Kong film directed by Roman Cheung
 Crazy Love (2007 film), a documentary about Burt Pugach directed by Dan Klores and Fisher Stevens
 Crazy Love (2014 film), a Chinese romantic comedy film directed by Cong Yi
 Crazy Love (2013 TV series), a South Korean television series
 Crazy Love (2022 TV series), a South Korean television series
 "Crazy Love" (Shameless), a television episode

Literature
 Crazy Love: Overwhelmed by a Relentless God, a 2008 Christian book by Francis Chan
 Crazy Love, a 2006 children's book by Eric Brown
 Crazy Love, a 2009 memoir by Leslie Morgan Steiner

Music

Albums
 Crazy Love (Hawk Nelson album) or the title song, 2011
 Crazy Love (Michael Bublé album) or the title cover of the Van Morrison song (see below), 2009
 Crazy Love, by Honey Is Cool, 1997

Songs
 "Crazy Love" (Allman Brothers song), 1979
 "Crazy Love" (CeCe Peniston song), 1992
 "Crazy Love" (MJ Cole song), 2000
 "Crazy Love" (Paul Anka song), 1958
 "Crazy Love" (Poco song), 1979
 "Crazy Love" (Van Morrison song), 1970
 "Crazy Love", by Adam Sandler from What the Hell Happened to Me?, 1996
 "Crazy Love", by Bon Jovi from 100,000,000 Bon Jovi Fans Can't Be Wrong, 2004
 "Crazy Love", by Frank Sinatra from This Is Sinatra Volume 2, 1958
 "Crazy Love", by Gruntruck from Push, 1992
 "Crazy Love", by Kim Chiu, 2007
 "Crazy Love", by Lady Antebellum from Ocean, 2019
 "Crazy Love", by Laura Nyro from Nested, 1978
 "Crazy Love", by Lodovica Comello from Mariposa, 2015
 "Crazy Love", by Luther Vandross from Your Secret Love, 1996
 "Crazy Love", by Mara feat. Beto Perez from Zumba Fitness - Dance Party Vol. 2, 2012
 "Crazy Love", by Ne-Yo from Libra Scale, 2010
 "Crazy Love, Vol. II", by Paul Simon from Graceland, 1986

See also
 Crazy in Love (disambiguation)